Darren James Hall (born 25 October 1965) is an English retired badminton player who is generally rated as one of the best men's singles players that England has produced and holds the record of 10 National singles titles.

Career
Hall won a record ten English national singles titles from 1986 until 1999. During the 1993 championships he broke the existing record of five, set in 1981 by his cousin Ray Stevens.

He is the only Englishman since the 1930s to win the prestigious Danish Open (1992) in the men's singles. He won the singles gold medal at the 1988 European Badminton Championships, defeating Morten Frost in the final.

Hall represented England in a demonstration of badminton at the 1988 Summer Olympics in Seoul, South Korea. He then competed in 1992 Summer Olympics in the men's singles. He lost in the second round to Zhao Jianhua, of China, 6–15, 9–15. In 1996, he played in the singles and doubles event. In the singles, he lost to Lee Gwang-jin of South Korea in the second round, 7–15, 11–15, and in the doubles event with Peter Knowles, they were defeated by Chinese pair Ge Cheng and Tao Xiaoqiang, 2–15, 3–15.

Hall competed at the Commonwealth Games in 1990 and 1998, and has collected a gold and three bronze medals.

Achievements

World Cup 
Men's singles

Commonwealth Games 
Men's singles

European Championships 
Men's singles

European Junior Championships 
Boys' doubles

IBF World Grand Prix 
The World Badminton Grand Prix was sanctioned by the International Badminton Federation from 1983 to 2006.

Men's singles

IBF International 
Men's singles

Men's doubles

References

External links 
 
 
 
 

1965 births
Living people
People from Walthamstow
English male badminton players
Badminton players at the 1988 Summer Olympics
Badminton players at the 1992 Summer Olympics
Badminton players at the 1996 Summer Olympics
Olympic badminton players of Great Britain
Badminton players at the 1990 Commonwealth Games
Badminton players at the 1998 Commonwealth Games
Commonwealth Games gold medallists for England
Commonwealth Games bronze medallists for England
Commonwealth Games medallists in badminton
Medallists at the 1990 Commonwealth Games
Medallists at the 1998 Commonwealth Games